There are schools named Coleman Elementary School in several U.S. states:
 Coleman Elementary School (Arkansas) in Pine Bluff, Arkansas
Coleman Intermediate School, formerly known as Coleman Elementary School, in Pine Bluff, Arkansas
Coleman Elementary School (Elgin, Illinois)
Coleman Elementary School (Wisconsin) in North Coleman, Wisconsin
Coleman Elementary School, part of the San Rafael City Schools district in San Rafael, California